Armanak-e Sofla (also Romanized as Armanak-e Soflá; also known as Azmanāk-e Soflá) is a village in Mokriyan-e Shomali Rural District, in the Central District of Miandoab County, West Azerbaijan Province, Iran. At the 2006 census, its population was 571, in 115 families.

References 

Populated places in Miandoab County